Weapons (stylized as WEAPONS) is a 2007 American teenage crime drama film directed and written by Adam Bhala Lough and starring Nick Cannon, Paul Dano, Mark Webber, Riley Smith, and Brandon Mychal Smith.

The film premiered in competition at the 2007 Sundance Film Festival and was released straight-to-DVD by Lionsgate in 2009.

Plot 
The film starts off in a violent crime committed against Reggie (Cannon), who ends up having his head blown off while eating a burger in a fast-food restaurant. After his death, the film unveils why Reggie died in the beginning of the film—and ultimately, who killed him.

Acts

Welcome Home 
The return of Sean (Webber) and his sequential, radical lifestyle—joined by Jason (Riley Smith) and Chris (Dano).

Bulletproof 
The previous day, Reggie and his sister Sabrina argue over the bruises on her face. She reveals to him that Jason gave her the scars during a rape, forcing Reggie to retaliate. He brings along his friend Mikey, (Yorker) and Mikey's younger brother James (Smith), to retrieve a gun from Mikey's distant, irrational uncle (Arliss Howard), solely to kill Jason.

I'm Making a Movie 
The night of Sabrina's rape through the eyes of Chris.

You Were My First 
Sabrina's revealed pregnancy the same night of her rape.

The Funeral 
The morning of Jason's funeral, Reggie's death, and his killer's breakdown.

Cast 
 Nick Cannon as Reggie
 Jade Yorker as Mikey
 Paul Dano as Chris
 Mark Webber as Sean
 Riley Smith as Jason
 Brandon Mychal Smith as James
 Serena Reeder as Darnelle

Production 

The film's budget estimated $500,000.

Dano's character uses a Sony PSR-PD150 in the film for his directorial debut.

Reception
The film was nominated for the Grand Jury Prize at the 2007 Sundance Film Festival but received extremely negative reviews from the critics upon release. At the review aggressor site Rotten Tomatoes, the film received a "rotten" score of 0% based on nine reviews. Critics felt the characters were "unlikeable" yet praised the acting.

Lawsuit and release 
There was a lawsuit against the revamped works towards the film, including the rape scene and also a scene where Dano's character urinates on a fellow party member. In general, the film was delayed when After Dark Films, the company that purchased the film at the Sundance Film Festival for a reported 1.1 million dollar advance, failed to contact Lough regarding releasing the film to theaters as planned; consequently, Lough teamed up with Lionsgate for releasing the unrated version of the film straight to DVD.

Music 
The film is notable for having an all DJ Screw soundtrack (the first of its kind) and an original score by the band International Friends, originally composed for the film, but inspired by DJ Screw music.

Awards and nominations

See also 
 List of hood films

References

External links 
 
 

2007 films
Hood films
Films directed by Adam Bhala Lough
2000s English-language films
2000s American films